Arvicanthis is a genus of rodent from Africa.  They are commonly referred to as unstriped grass mice, unstriped grass rats, and kusu rats.

Species
Genus Arvicanthis - unstriped grass mice
Abyssinian grass rat, Arvicanthis abyssinicus Rüppell, 1842
Sudanian grass rat, Arvicanthis ansorgei Thomas, 1910
Blick's grass rat, Arvicanthis blicki Frick, 1914
Nairobi grass rat, Arvicanthis nairobae J. A. Allen, 1909
Neumann's grass rat, Arvicanthis neumanni Matschie, 1894
African grass rat, Arvicanthis niloticus É. Geoffroy, 1803
Guinean grass rat, Arvicanthis rufinus Temminck, 1853
Genetic evidence indicates that the extinct Canariomys is also nested within this genus.

References

Musser, G. G. and M. D. Carleton. 2005. Superfamily Muroidea. pp. 894–1531 in Mammal Species of the World a Taxonomic and Geographic Reference. D. E. Wilson and D. M. Reeder eds. Johns Hopkins University Press, Baltimore.

 
Rodent genera
Taxa named by René Lesson